Kārlis Padegs (8 October 1911 – 19 April 1940) was a Latvian artist. He studied under Latvian painter Vilhelms Purvītis at the Latvia Art Academy. His best-known work is Madonna with Machine Gun, which belongs to the Latvian National Museum of Art in Riga.

Biography 

Kārlis Padegs was born on 8 October 1911 in Torņakalns, a workers district of Riga. He died in Riga in April 1940 from tuberculosis, aged 28.

Art 

After an exhibition mounted in 1933, Padegs' art became an expression of unpleasant, even ugly traits, contrasting with the contemporary tendency towards beauty in Latvian art. Padegs once said: "I must often listen to reproaches- why do you draw such disgusting pictures when there is so much beauty in the world?- But there are also many abominable things and somebody must draw them too, I answer. I want to show the seamy side of life which we do not like to see in order not to spoil our feeling of comfort or our good appetite".

References

External links 

 Kārlis Padegs at Virtual Art Gallery

1911 births
1940 deaths
Artists from Riga
20th-century Latvian painters
Expressionist painters
Modern painters
20th-century deaths from tuberculosis
Tuberculosis deaths in Latvia